= Kanasaiya =

Kanasaiya Kahna Sayiya, Kanha Saiya, Kanha Saiyan
- village
- Location within Madhya Pradesh Location within India
- Coordinates: 23.2928373°N 77.5110614°E
- Country: India
- State: Madhya Pradesh
- District: Bhopal
- Tehsil: Huzur
- Elevation: 487 m (1,598 ft)

Population (2011)
  - Total: 6,084
- Time zone: UTC+5:30 (IST)
- ISO 3166 code: MP-IN
- 2011 census code: 482429

Kanasaiya is a village in the Bhopal district of Madhya Pradesh, India. It is located in the Huzur tehsil and the Phanda block.

== Demographics ==
According to the 2011 census of India, Kanasaiya has 1224 households. The effective literacy rate (i.e. the literacy rate of population excluding children aged 6 and below) is 63.37%.

Demographics (2011 Census)
	Total	Male	Female
Population	6084	3169	2915
Children aged below 6 years	1003	513	490
Scheduled caste	1714	883	831
Scheduled tribe	281	140	141
Literates	3220	1914	1306
Workers (all)	2364	1724	640
Main workers (total)	2107	1599	508
Main workers: Cultivators	311	219	92
Main workers: Agricultural labourers	464	290	174
Main workers: Household industry workers	81	54	27
Main workers: Other	1251	1036	215
Marginal workers (total)	257	125	132
Marginal workers: Cultivators	17	6	11
Marginal workers: Agricultural labourers	58	28	30
Marginal workers: Household industry workers	13	5	8
Marginal workers: Others	169	86	83
Non-workers	3720	1445	2275
